Chase Simon (born March 11, 1989) is an American professional basketball player for JDA Dijon of the LNB Pro A. He played college basketball for Central Michigan and Detroit.

Early life and college career
Simon attended Detroit Community High School in Detroit, Michigan, where he averaged 23 points and seven rebounds per game, leading his team to the quarter-finals at the 2007 state tournament. Simon earned a spot in the First-team Class C All-State.

Simon started his college basketball career at Central Michigan, where he averaged 4.1 points and 1.5 rebounds per game in his freshman year. On September 3, 2008, Simon was transferred from Central Michigan to Detroit, but sat out first season at Detroit per NCAA Transfer rules. In his senior year at Detroit, he averaged 13.2 points, 4.3 rebounds, 2.4 assists and 1.1 steals per game. Simon finished his UDM career with 1,386 points – 17th in Titan history.

Professional career

Šiauliai (2012–2013)
After going undrafted in the 2012 NBA draft, Simon joined the Chicago Bulls for the 2012 NBA Summer League.

On September 26, 2012, Simon signed his first professional contract with Greek team Aris. However, Simon parted ways with Aris due to the club's financial difficulties before appearing in any game for them.

On October 19, 2012, Simon signed with the Lithuanian team Šiauliai for the 2012–13 season.

Siarka Tarnobrzeg (2013–2014)
On August 15, 2013, Simon signed a one-year deal with the Polish team Siarka Tarnobrzeg.

Anwil Włocławek (2014–2015)
On August 7, 2014, Simon signed with Anwil Włocławek for the 2014–15 season. On December 28, 2014, Simon recorded a career-high 30 points, shooting 10-of-14 from the field, along with three rebounds in a 72–91 loss to Śląsk Wrocław. In 30 games played for Włocławek, he averaged 16.8 points, 3.3 rebounds, 2.3 assists and 1.7 steals per game.

Manresa (2015–2016)
On August 25, 2015, Simon signed a one-year deal with the Spanish team Manresa.

Maccabi Ashdod (2016–2017)
On August 8, 2016, Simon signed with the Israeli team Maccabi Ashdod for the 2016–17 season. On March 13, 2017, Simon recorded a season-high 29 points, shooting 12-of-22 from the field in a 94–70 blowout win over Bnei Herzliya. On April 13, 2017, Simon recorded 22 points, shooting 6-of-8 from 3-point range, along with four rebounds and four assists in an 82–77 win over Maccabi Haifa. He was subsequently named Israeli League Round 27 MVP.

In 33 games played for Ashdod, Simon finished the season as the league fifth-leading scorer with 17.1 points, while also averaging 4.6 rebounds, 3.4 assists and 1.2 steals per game.

JL Bourg (2017–2018)
On July 7, 2017, Simon signed a one-year deal with JL Bourg of the French Pro A League. On March 16, 2018, Simon recorded a season-high 23 points, shooting 7-of-13 from the field, along with six rebounds in an 82–93 loss to Pau-Orthez.

Return to Włocławek (2018–2020)
On September 8, 2018, Simon returned to Anwil Włocławek for a second stint, signing a one-year deal.

JDA Dijon (2020–present)
On June 17, 2020, he has signed with JDA Dijon of the LNB Pro A.

Personal life
Simon was raised by his mother Denise Simon on the West side of Detroit. His cousin, Randy Brown, played basketball at New Mexico State and for three NBA teams.

References

External links
Detroit Mercy Titans bio
RealGM Profile

1989 births
Living people
20th-century African-American people
21st-century African-American sportspeople
African-American basketball players
American expatriate basketball people in France
American expatriate basketball people in Israel
American expatriate basketball people in Lithuania
American expatriate basketball people in Poland
American expatriate basketball people in Spain
American men's basketball players
Siarka Tarnobrzeg (basketball) players
Basketball players from Detroit
Bàsquet Manresa players
BC Šiauliai players
Central Michigan Chippewas men's basketball players
Detroit Mercy Titans men's basketball players
JDA Dijon Basket players
JL Bourg-en-Bresse players
KK Włocławek players
Liga ACB players
Maccabi Ashdod B.C. players
Shooting guards
Small forwards